Talaash (Urdu: تلاش, literal English translation: "Search") is Pakistan television mini-series featuring Junoon, a popular Pakistani sufi rock music group. It was written by Anwar Maqsood and directed by Atiqa Odho. Due to its novel storyline it became an extremely popular drama in Pakistan.

Cast
Salman Ahmad
Atiqa Odho
Ali Azmat
Brian O'Connell
Sania Saeed

Junoon (band)
Pakistani drama television series
Pakistan Television Corporation original programming
Urdu-language television shows